The 2022 Iraq FA Cup Final was the 29th final of the Iraq FA Cup as a clubs-only competition. The match was contested between Al-Karkh and Al-Kahrabaa, at Al-Madina Stadium in Baghdad. It was played on 16 July 2022 to be the final match of the competition. Al-Karkh made their first appearance in the Iraq FA Cup final while Al-Kahrabaa made their second appearance.

Al-Karkh won the match 2–1 with goals from Jafar Obeis and Hasan Abdulkareem to earn their first Iraq FA Cup title.

Route to the Final

Note: In all results below, the score of the finalist is given first (H: home; A: away; N: neutral).

Match

Details

Notes

References

External links
 Iraq Football Association

Football competitions in Iraq
2021–22 in Iraqi football
Iraq FA Cup